Mitchells Island is the largest of several islands in the mouth of the Manning River. It is bordered on the north by the main channel of the Manning River, on the southwest by Scotts Creek, and on the east by the Pacific Ocean. The ocean edge extends from Old Bar in the south to Harrington to the north.

It is named after Thomas Livingstone Mitchell (1792–1855), who served as Surveyor-General for Australia. It and the adjacent Oxley Island is a shale outcrop rather than a sandy deposit.

The population of Mitchells Island is approximately 300 permanent residents. Much of the island was covered by dairy farms but today there is only one remaining farm. It is a popular holiday location and has two caravan parks and many rental homes and units.

Mitchells Island largely consists of dense rainforest, home to many native animals including koalas, echidnas, wallabies, possums, bandicoots, quolls, goannas and birds.

The housing estate Manning Waters was developed in 1991 with two houses, growing to 36 homes today. The Islands historical St. Marks church was built in 1872, its first service on 6 June of that year. Legend has it the Church was built from a large cedar log washed down river from the timber mill during floods, and the cemetery is on the highest point of the Island looking over the river towards the little brother mountain ranges.
Besides the holiday rental units, it has a general store, a bowling club, the two caravan parks, a cafe, and a bait shop. The general store is also the news agent, the video rental shop, the Australia Post Office, the bottle shop, the burger and fish and chips grill, and the grocery store.

The Pacific Ocean forms the eastern border of the island. While the entire length is a sand beach, there are two accesses. The northern access is from the village of Manning Point and is reinforced to allow four-wheel drive vehicle access. The southern access is from Beach Road. This access is a narrow path over the boundary dune. Neither beach is patrolled.

References

Islands of New South Wales
Suburbs of Mid-Coast Council